Santo Rinaldi (1620–1676) was an Italian painter of the Baroque period. He was  an excellent  painter of battle scenes, landscapes, and architectural conceits (vedute). He was also called il Tromba. He was born at Florence and initially trained with Francesco Furini.

References

1620 births
1676 deaths
Painters from Florence
Italian Baroque painters
Italian battle painters